The Minister of Foreign Affairs of the Republic of Cuba is a cabinet minister in charge of the Ministry of Foreign Affairs of Cuba, responsible for conducting foreign relations of the country.

List
The following is a list of foreign ministers of Cuba since 1933:

See also
 Cabinet of Cuba
 List of current foreign ministers
 List of current permanent representatives to the United Nations

References

 
.Foreign
Foreign, Cuba
Foreign Ministers